Karel Höger (17 June 1909 – 4 May 1977) was a Czechoslovakian film actor. He appeared in nearly 100 films between 1939 and 1977.

Selected filmography
 In the Still of the Night (1941)
 Enchanted (1942)
 Gabriela (1942)
 Fourteen at the Table (1943)
 Lost in the Suburbs (1948)
 Krakatit (1948)
 A Dead Man Among the Living (1949)
 Old Czech Legends (1953)
 Nástup (1953)
 Jan Hus (1954)
 Jan Žižka (1955)
 Vlacek Kolejacek (1959)
 The Fabulous Baron Munchausen (1961)
 Lucie (1963)
 I, Justice (1967)
 Noc na Karlštejně (1973)

References

External links
 

1909 births
1977 deaths
Czech male film actors
Czech male voice actors
Czechoslovak male voice actors
Actors from Brno
People from the Margraviate of Moravia
20th-century Czech male actors
Czech male stage actors